Anders Henrik Falck  (25 November 1772 – 30 November 1851) was a Finnish politician.

Falck was born in Kerimäki. He was a Vice-chairman the economic division of the Senate of Finland (1828–1833). He died in Kauttua.

1772 births
1851 deaths
Finnish senators
People from Kerimäki
19th-century Finnish politicians